Wensley Ivan William Frederick Pithey (21 June 1914 – 10 November 1993) was a South African   character actor who had a long stage and film career in Britain.

Biography
Pithey was born in Cape Town, South Africa. A graduate of the University of Cape Town where he studied music and drama, he travelled to Britain in 1947. He appeared in various Shakespearean roles in his long career (memorably as Sir Toby Belch) as well as appearing in Eugene O'Neill's Anna Christie. He also directed and produced plays in the West End and appeared in a range of roles on television including the 1976 drama Edward and Mrs Simpson (as Winston Churchill – a role he also played in the miniseries Ike) as well as Special Branch and Poldark. His British television appearances included Danger Man (1961) among others. He also played the title role Detective Superintendent Charlesworth in a number of BBC series including Charlesworth at Large (1958) and its sequel Charlesworth the following year. In 1964 he played a ballistics expert in the BBC series Call the Gun Expert.

Between 1961 and 1976, Pithey appeared in German TV commercials as a fake coffee expert for Tchibo.

Filmography

Film

 The Mark of Cain (1947) as Opera House Attendant (uncredited)
 London Belongs to Me (1948) as First Warden
 It's Hard to Be Good (1948) as Vicar (uncredited)
 Cardboard Cavalier (1949) as Jailer
 Your Witness (1950) as Alfred
 Guilt Is My Shadow (1950) as Tillingham
 The Woman's Angle (1952) (uncredited)
 Brandy for the Parson (1952) as Circus Owner
 Father's Doing Fine (1952) as Policeman (uncredited)
 Lady in the Fog (1952) as Sid - the Barman
 The Titfield Thunderbolt (1953) as A Policeman
 The Diamond (1954) as Springwell Police Sergeant (uncredited)
 The Men of Sherwood Forest (1954) as Hugo
 Isn't Life Wonderful! (1954) as Sam
 Tiger in the Smoke (1956) as Detective Sergeant Pickett
 You Can't Escape (1956) (uncredited)
 Doctor at Large (1957) as Sam - Poacher
 Kill Me Tomorrow (1957) as Inspector Lane
 Hell Drivers (1957) as Pop
 The Long Haul (1957) as Minor Role
 Blue Murder at St. Trinian's (1957) as Brigadier (uncredited)
 Serious Charge (1959) as Police Sergeant
 Make Mine Mink (1960) as Superintendent (uncredited)
 The Pure Hell of St Trinian's (1960) as Chief Constable
 Snowball (1960) as Jim Adams
 The Barber of Stamford Hill (1962) as Mr. O
 The Boys (1962) as Mr. Coulter
 The Knack ...and How to Get It (1965) as Teacher
 Oliver! (1968) as Dr. Grimwig
 Oh! What a Lovely War (1969) as Archduke Franz Ferdinand (uncredited)
 One of Our Dinosaurs Is Missing (1975) as Bromley
 The Saint and the Brave Goose (1979) as Franklyn
 Red Monarch (1983) as Voroshilov
 White Mischief (1987) as Sheridan
 American Friends (1991) as Cave

Television

 Little Women (1950–1951) as Mr. James Laurence
 Midshipman Barney (1951) as Snarks
 BBC Sunday-Night Theatre (1951–1957) as Multiple roles
 Robin Hood (1953) as Friar Tuck
 Wednesday Theatre (1953) as Tom Pascoe
 A Castle and Sixpence (1954) as Mr. Parsons
 The Gentle Falcon (1954) as Innkeeper
 Fabian of the Yard (1956) as  Jerry Watson
 David Copperfield (1956) as Captain Mercier Mr. Tungay
 ITV Play of the Week (1956–1967) as Multiple roles
 Assignment Foreign Legion (1957) as Captain Mercier
 Overseas Press Club - Exclusive! (1957) as Father Tsouderos
 Mister Charlesworth (1957) as Det. Chief Insp. Charlesworth
 Nicholas Nickleby (1957) as Vincent Crummles
 Shadow Squad (1957) as Inspector Smith
 Big Guns (1958) as Det. Supt. Charlesworth
 Caxton's Tales (1958) as  Mortimer Benson
 The Diary of Samuel Pepys as Viscount Brouncker
 The Firm of Girdlestone (1958) as Dr. Dimsdale
 The New Adventures of Charlie Chan (1958) as James Collins
 Ivanhoe (1958) as  Earl of Pembroke
 Charlesworth at Large (1958) as Det. Supt. Charlesworth
 Armchair Theatre (1958–1960) as Multiple roles
 The Last Chronicle of Barset (1959) as Mr. Walker
 Charlesworth (1959) as Det. Supt. Charlesworth
 Probation Officer (1960) as  Mr. Moffat
 Yorky (1960) as Fred Piggott
 The Larkins (1960) as  George Potter
 Somerset Maugham Hour (1960) as Willem
 Persuasion (1960–1961) as  Mr. Musgrove
 No Hiding Place (1961) as  Joe Smith
 Dixon of Dock Green (1961) as Paul Wigram
 Danger Man (1961) as Senor Lazar
 Here's Harry (1961) as Police Chief
 Boyd Q.C. (1961) as Mr. Wodhurst
 Deadline Midnight (1961) as Frederick Hall
 Sir Francis Drake (1961) as Davey Preston
 Jacks and Knaves (1961) as Chief Inspector
 BBC Sunday-Night Play (1961) as  Col. Von Schwendi
 Zero One (1962) as Unknown role
 The Scales of Justice (1962) as Mr. Robbins
 Playbox (1962–1963) as Barrington Blizard, QC
 Suspense (1963) as Bradwell
 Man of the World (1963) as President Ruschek
 The Saint (1963) as Insp. Claude Teal
 Teletale (1963) as  Prof. Bür-Malottke
 The Plane Makers (1964) as Bill Ingram
 Sergeant Cork (1964) as Bill Ingram
 Call the Gun Expert (1964) as Robert Churchill
 Love Story (1964) as  Jack Wightman
 Gideon's Way (1964) as Supt. Bill Hemmingway
 The Airbase (1965) as Mr. Swearingen
 The Sullavan Brothers (1965) as Corcoran
 Blackmail (1965) as Eric Palmer
 Mrs Thursday (1966) as George Dunrich
 City '68 (1967–1968) as Alderman Sankey
 Her Majesty's Pleasure (1968) as Governor
 Callan (1969) as  Det. Insp. Charwood
 Special Branch (1969) as  Det. Supt. Eden
 Nearest and Dearest (1970) as  Leonard Longbottom
 The Main Chance (1970) as Lord Bennett
 Doomwatch (1972) as Dr. Ericson
 The Adventurer (1972) as Nicholas
 Coronation Street (1972–1974) as Wilfred Perkins
 Sykes (1973) as Multiple roles
 Zodiac (1974) as Inspector Duggan
 Poldark (1975) as Jeffrey Clymer
 Beasts (1976) as Mr. Liversedge
 Premiere as Chief Insp. Lymington
 The Devil's Crown (1978) as  Saladin
 Edward and Mrs. Simpson (1978) as Winston Churchill
 Return of the Saint (1979) as  Franklyn
 Ike (1979) as Winston Churchill
 The Old Curiosity Shop (1979–1980) as The Single Gentleman
 The Gentle Touch (1982) as  Dr. Quesne
 Number 10 (1983) as Edward VII
 Love and Marriage (1984) as  Owen Merrick
 Howards' Way (1986) as George Johnson
 In Sickness and in Health (1987) as Equerry
 Blind Justice (1988) as Sir Charles Bingham
 Lipstick on Your Collar (1993) as Elderly Gentleman

References

External links
Obituary in The Independent

1914 births
1993 deaths
South African male film actors
South African male stage actors
South African male television actors
Male actors from Cape Town
British male Shakespearean actors
University of Cape Town alumni
20th-century South African male actors
South African emigrants to the United Kingdom